The 2019 Hokkaido Bank Curling Classic was held August 1–4, 2019 in Sapporo, Japan. It was the second event of the 2019–20 curling season. The total purse for the event was ¥ 1,700,000.

In the Men's event, Yuta Matsumura defeated Scott McDonald 7–2 in the final and Kirk Muyres beat Kim Soo-hyuk 7–3 in the Bronze Medal Game. In the Women's event, Jiang Yilun defeated Satsuki Fujisawa 7–2 in the final and Mei Jie beat Tracy Fleury 7–5 in the Bronze Medal Game.

Men

Teams
The teams are listed as follows:

Round-robin standings
Final round-robin standings

Round-robin results
All draw times are listed in Japan Standard Time (UTC+09:00).

Draw 2
Thursday, August 1, 13:00

Draw 3
Friday, August 2, 08:00

Draw 5
Friday, August 2, 15:00

Draw 7
Saturday, August 3, 08:00

Draw 9
Saturday, August 3, 15:00

Playoffs
Source:

Semifinals
Sunday, August 4, 08:00

Final
Sunday, August 4, 11:30

Bronze-medal game
Sunday, August 4, 11:30

Women

Teams

The teams are listed as follows:

Round-robin standings
Final round-robin standings

Round-robin results
All draw times are listed in Japan Standard Time (UTC+09:00).

Draw 1
Thursday, August 1, 09:30

Draw 4
Friday, August 2, 11:30

Draw 6
Friday, August 2, 18:30

Draw 8
Saturday, August 3, 11:30

Draw 10
Saturday, August 3, 18:30

Playoffs
Source:

Semifinals
Sunday, August 4, 08:00

Final
Sunday, August 4, 17:00

Bronze-medal game
Sunday, August 4, 17:00

References

External links
Men's Event
Women's Event

2019 in Japanese sport
2019 in curling
August 2019 sports events in Japan
International curling competitions hosted by Japan
Sport in Sapporo